American Library in Paris Book Award was created in 2013 with a donation from the Florence Gould Foundation. It is awarded each November with a remunerative prize of $5,000 to "a work written originally in English that deepens and stimulates our understanding of France or the French.."

The American Library in Paris "was founded and originally run by American expatriates in Paris in 1920, with books that had been sent by American libraries to soldiers fighting in World War I."

Honorees

2013
The shortlist was announced in September, and the winner in December 2013.

Winner: Fredrik Logevall, Embers of War: The Fall of an Empire and the Making of America's Vietnam 

Shortlist:
Simon van Booy, The Illusion of Separateness
Alex Danchev, Cezanne: A Life (about Paul Cézanne)
Tom Reiss, The Black Count: Glory, Revolution, Betrayal, and the Real Count of Monte Cristo
Marilyn Yalom, How the French Invented Love

Jury: Diane Johnson, Adam Gopnik and Julian Barnes

2014
The shortlist was announced in July, and the winner in November 2014.

Winner: Robert Harris, An Officer and a Spy

Shortlist:
Jonathan Beckman, How to Ruin a Queen: Marie Antoinette, the Stolen Diamonds and the Scandal that Shook the French Throne
Frederick Brown, The Embrace of Unreason: France 1914 - 1940
Sean B. Carroll, Brave Genius: A Scientist, a Philosopher, and their Daring Adventures from the French Resistance to the Nobel Prize
Philip Dwyer, Citizen Emperor: Napoleon in Power 1799 - 1815
Francine Prose, Lovers at the Chameleon Club, Paris 1932

Jury: Alice Kaplan, Sebastian Faulks, and Pierre Assouline

2015
The shortlist was announced in July, and the winner was announced 6 November 2015. 

Winner: Laura Auricchio, The Marquis: Lafayette Reconsidered

Shortlist:
 Nancy L. Green, The Other Americans in Paris: Businessmen, Countesses, Wayward Youth 1880-1941
 Richard C. Keller, Fatal Isolation: The Devastating Paris Heat Wave of 2003
 Sue Roe, In Montmartre: Picasso, Matisse, and Modernism in Paris, 1900-1910
 Ronald Rosbottom, When Paris Went Dark: The City of Light Under German Occupation 1940-1944

Jury: Laura Furman, Lily Tuck, Fredrik Logevall

2016
The shortlist was announced in July, and the winner was announced on 3 November 2016.

Winner: Ethan B. Katz, The Burdens of Brotherhood: Jews and Muslims from North Africa to France

Shortlist: 
Jo Baker, A Country Road, A Tree
 Sarah Bakewell, At the Existentialist Café: Freedom, Being, and Apricot Cocktails
 Julie Barlow and Jean-Benoît Nadeau, The Bonjour Effect: The Secret Codes of French Conversation Revealed
 David Drake, Paris at War: 1939-1944
 Lucy Sante, The Other Paris

Jury: Laura Auricchio, Robert Harris, Robert O. Paxton

2017
The shortlist was announced in July, and the winner was announced on 3 November 2017.

Winner: David Bellos, The Novel of the Century: The Extraordinary Adventure of Les Misérables

Shortlist:
 David McAninch, Duck Season: Eating, Drinking, and Other Misadventures in Gascony, France's Last Best Place
 Adam Gidwitz, The Inquisitor's Tale: or, The Three Magical Children and Their Holy Dog
 Ross King, Mad Enchantment: Claude Monet and the Painting of the Water Lilies
 Nadja Spiegelman, I'm Supposed to Protect You From All This: A Memoir
 Susan Rubin Suleiman, The Némirovksy Question: The Life, Death, and Legacy of a Jewish Writer in Twentieth-Century France

Jury: Adam Gopnik, Bruno Racine, Stacy Schiff

2018 
The shortlist was announced in July, and the winner was announced on 8 November 2018.

Winner: Julian Jackson, A Certain Idea of France: The Life of Charles de Gaulle

Shortlist
 Adam Begley, The Great Nadar: The Man Behind the Camera
 Bijan Omrani, Caesar’s Footprints: A Cultural Excursion to Ancient France: Journeys Through Roman Gaul
 Rupert Thomson, Never Anyone But You
 Caroline Weber, Proust’s Duchess: How Three Celebrated Women Captured the Imagination of Fin-de-Siècle Paris

Jury: Diane Johnson, David Bellos, and Pierre Assouline

2019 
The shortlist was announced in July, and the winner was announced on 7 November 2019.

Winner: Marc Weitzmann, Hate: The Rising Tide of Anti-Semitism in France (and What it Means for Us)

Shortlist

Edward Carey, Little: A Novel
Andrew S. Curran, Diderot and the Art of Thinking Freely
David Elliott, Voices: The Final Hours of Joan of Arc
Stéphane Hénaut and Jeni Mitchell, A Bite-Sized History of France: Gastronomic Tales of Revolution, War, and Enlightenment
Julie Orringer, The Flight Portfolio: A Novel

Jury: Alice Kaplan, Thomas Chatterton Williams, and Pamela Druckerman

Coups de coeur

In addition to the six shortlisted titles, the screening committee selected the following five books as worthy of special recognition:

Mark Braude, The Invisible Emperor: Napoleon on Elba from Exile to Escape
Peter Caddick-Adams, Sand and Steel: The D-Day Invasion and the Liberation of France
Christopher L. Miller, Impostors: Literary Hoaxes and Cultural Authenticity
Whitney Scharer, The Age of Light: A Novel
Christopher Tilghman, Thomas and Beal in the Midi

2020 
The shortlist was announced in July, and the winner was announced on 14 January 2021.

Winner: Maggie Paxson, The Plateau

Shortlist

 Bill Buford, Dirt: Adventures in Lyon as a Chef in Training, Father, and Sleuth Looking for the Secret of French Cooking 
 James Gardner, The Louvre: The Many Lives of the World’s Most Famous Museum
 Caitlin Horrocks, The Vexations: A Novel
 Rachel Mesch, Before Trans: Three Gender Stories from Nineteenth-Century France
 Maurice Samuels, The Betrayal of the Duchess: The Scandal That Unmade the Bourbon Monarchy and Made France Modern 

Jury: Ethan Katz, Rachel Donadio, and Jake Lamar

2021 
The shortlist was announced in July 2021 , and the winner was announced on 20 January 2022.

Winner: Sudhir Hazareesingh, Black Spartacus: The Epic Life of Toussaint Louverture

Shortlist

 Michaela Carter, Leonora in the Morning Light 
 Edmund de Waal, Letters to Camondo
 Emma Rothschild, An Infinite History: The Story of a Family in France over Three Centuries
 Jane Smiley, Perestroika in Paris 

Jury: Lauren Collins, Julian Jackson, Dinaw Mengestu, and Maggie Paxson

2022 

The shortlist was announced in July 2022, and the winner was announced on 3 November 2022.

Winner: Graham Robb, France: An Adventure History

Shortlist

 Amanda Bestor-Siegal, The Caretakers, A Novel
 Maud Casey, City of Incurable Women
 J.P. Daughton, In the Forest of No Joy: The Congo-Océan Railroad and the Tragedy of French Colonialism
 Peter Watson, The French Mind: 400 Years of Romance, Revolution and Renewal

Jury: Charles Trueheart (chair), Thomas Chatterton Williams, and Alexandra Schwartz

References

External links
American Library in Paris Book Award, official website

2013 establishments in France
Awards established in 2013
French literary awards